Ming Pao is a Chinese-language newspaper published by Media Chinese International in Hong Kong. In the 1990s, Ming Pao established four overseas branches in North America; each provides independent reporting on local news and collects local advertisements. Currently, of the overseas editions, only the two Canadian editions remain: Ming Pao Toronto and Ming Pao Vancouver. In a 2019 survey from the Chinese University of Hong Kong sampling 1079 local households, Ming Pao was listed as the second most credible paid newspaper in Hong Kong.

History

Launch, early days 

Ming Pao was first published on 20 May 1959, and was founded by the famous Chinese Wuxia novelist Louis Cha, known better by his pseudonym Jin Yong (金庸), and his friend, Shen Pao Sing (沈寶新).

Daisy Li Yuet-Wah won an International Press Freedom Award from the Committee to Protect Journalists for her work with the paper in 1994.

Before British Hong Kong's handover to the People's Republic of China by the United Kingdom in 1997, Ming Pao was considered hostile to the Chinese authority. When China reunited with Hong Kong, the controversial editors of Ming Pao turned favorable towards the Chinese government.

Merger with Malaysia Sinchew and Nanyang Groups 

In October 1995, the publisher of Ming Pao, Ming Pao Enterprise was taken over by Tiong Hiew King (Chinese: 張曉卿). On 29 January 2007, Tiong released a proposal to merge the three media groups – Sin Chew Media Corporation Berhad (Malaysia), Nanyang Press Holdings Berhad (Malaysia) and Ming Pao Enterprise Corporation Limited (Hong Kong). The merged group, named Media Chinese International Limited was dual-listed on the main boards of the Stock Exchange of Hong Kong and the Bursa Malaysia Securities Berhad in April 2008. All of the existing groups retain their existing publications and independent operations.

The website of Ming Pao was set up in 1995, one of the earliest newspaper websites in Hong Kong.

Since April 2008, Ming Pao is published by Ming Pao Newspapers Limited, a subsidiary of Media Chinese International Limited.

International development 

Ming Pao set up a Toronto office in Canada in May 1993 to publish the Ming Pao Eastern Edition, then set up a Vancouver office in October the same year for the Ming Pao Western Edition.

In April 1997, the group set up a New York office and started publishing the Ming Pao US East Coast Edition. The journal launched in the San Francisco Bay Area in April 2004 with a print run of 25,000, the sixth Chinese newspapers to be distributed in the region. In 2007, the office also published the New York Free Newspaper.

Ming Pao New York and Ming Pao San Francisco ceased operations on 31 January and 14 February 2009, respectively. The closing of NY operations was a symbol of the weakening of ethnic newspapers of the region. The group merged the resources of Ming Pao New York and the New York Free Newspaper to create Ming Pao Daily Free News (New York), serving the Chinese community along the US East Coast.

Controversies

Chinese Communist Party Influence 

A 2001 report on Chinese media censorship by the Jamestown Foundation cited Ming Pao as one of four major overseas Chinese newspapers directly or indirectly controlled by Beijing.

“The dominant Chinese media vehicle in America is the newspaper," wrote the report's lead author Mei Duzhe. "Four major Chinese newspapers are found in the U.S.—World Journal, Sing Tao Daily, Ming Pao Daily News, and The China Press. Of these four, three are either directly or indirectly controlled by the government of Mainland China, while the fourth (run out of Taiwan) has recently begun bowing to pressure from the Beijing government.”

The report also noted that the CCP started purchasing important Hong Kong news media companies, including Ming Pao, through third parties, in preparation for the Hong Kong hand-over to the People's Republic of China in 1997.
“Employees at Ming Pao'''s New York office have told sources that their 'true boss' is none other than the Chinese Consulate [in New York], and that they are obligated to do whatever the Consulate asks," it said.

A 2006 study of Ming Pao editorials noted a tendency toward self-censorship concerning criticism toward Beijing. According to a 2013 report by Center for International Media Assistance, "The Long Shadow of Chinese Censorship: How the Communist Party's Media Restrictions Affect News Outlets Around the World,":

"Before and after the 1997 [Hong Kong] transition, a number of influential newspapers run as family businesses were bought by tycoons with business interests in China and close ties to mainland officials, such as Ming Pao Daily, Sing Tao Daily, and Sing Pao," said the report. "Soon, a number of observable patterns emerged at these and other outlets signaling growing pressure within the media industry to reduce criticism of the central government…"

 Assault on former chief editor Kevin Lau 

Kevin Lau, who had been chief editor of the journal until January 2014, was attacked in the morning of 26 February 2014 in Sai Wan Ho, Hong Kong. He was seriously injured in a targeted knife attack. It was widely speculated that the attack may have been driven by political motivation, and related to its role in investigation by the International Consortium of Investigative Journalists (ICIJ) into the offshore assets of China's leaders, including relatives of Communist Party general secretary Xi Jinping, former Premier Wen Jiabao, and several members of the National People's CongressMullany, Gerry (25 February 2014). "Hong Kong Editor Whose Ouster Stirred Protests Is Slashed" . The New York Times Journalists and press of the world saw the attack as an attack on press freedom. Thousands of people, led by leading journalists, attended a rally to denounce violence and intimidation of the media.

During the court hearings of the two suspects, one declared that he was looking to get a $100,000 reward with this attack.

 Appointment of Chong Tien Siong 

In 2014, the appointment of new chief editor Chong Tien Siong sparked controversy and internal revolt, due to Siong's close ties to Beijing, and was seen as a major threat to the Chinese-language newspaper's editorial independence.

 Censorship on Tiananmen Massacre Ming Pao was subject to controversy in 2015 after editor-in-chief Chong Tien-siong ordered that a story detailing the Tiananmen massacre be replaced with a story about Chinese Internet giant Alibaba as a "role model for young, would-be entrepreneurs". Chum Shun-kin said the story that was pulled contained details about the history of the massacre, including eyewitness accounts of the killing of civilians and information from diplomatic cables from Canada. The pulling of the Tiananmen story has been criticised by some, including Civic Party lawmaker Claudia Mo who said that Chong appears to "want to shield Beijing from embarrassment, instead of acting in the interests of the public and protecting their right to information".

Hong Kong Journalists Association spokeswoman Shum Yee-lan called on Chong to "communicate" with his own staff.

 Termination of chief editor Keung Kwok-yuen 
The journal's executive chief editor, Keung Kwok-yuen, was abruptly terminated on 20 April 2016, the same day that a report based on the Panama Papers was published on its front page. Management said that the paper's turnover had been falling in since last year and the Keung had been laid off with immediate effect due to difficult operating conditions. The timing of Keung's removal led to speculation that the Panama Papers report, which connected a number of influential individuals in the territory to tax havens abroad, may have been considered sensitive, thus being the real reason for the dismissal.

Keung had written several weeks earlier about the suppression of Ten Years, a dystopian film about Hong Kong in the year 2025 that was banned in mainland China. Staff and the union publicly denounced editor-in-chief Chong Tien Siong's decision to "punish editorial staff who have different opinions", and questioned the cost reduction pretext as an excuse. Journalists at Ming Pao manifested the concern felt by the media at large, several of them protested by filed blank space reports in an edition the Sunday following the dismissal.

Editorials for 2019 anti-extradition bill protests
On 13–14 June 2019, Ming Pao published editorials to define the 2019–20 Hong Kong protests as a riot, blaming the violence of the protesters. However, on 14 June, the instant news section of mingpao.com, the web portal of the publisher, published a statement to declare that the editorial represents the newspaper, but not the frontier staff of the publisher. The translator of the editorial refused to translate the article to English as well as any editorials in the future in protest.

On 17 June 2019, Ming Pao'' published an open letter written by some of its employees criticizing the June 13 editorial for being biased towards the establishment and damaging the reputation of the newspaper.

See also
 Newspapers of Hong Kong
 Media of Hong Kong

References

External links 
 

Chinese-language newspapers published in Hong Kong
Newspapers established in 1959
Chinese-language newspapers published in the United States
Non-English-language newspapers published in California
Non-English-language newspapers published in New York (state)
Defunct newspapers published in New York City
1959 establishments in Hong Kong
Daily newspapers published in New York City